Annika Åhnberg (born 1949) is a Swedish politician of the Social Democratic Party and formerly of the Left Party.

Åhnberg resigned from the Left Party in 1992 due to the party's resistance to Swedish membership in the European Union. She served as Minister for Rural Affairs in 1996–1998, in a Social Democratic cabinet.

References

1949 births
20th-century Swedish politicians
20th-century Swedish women politicians
Women government ministers of Sweden
Swedish Ministers for Agriculture
Members of the Riksdag from the Left Party (Sweden)
Members of the Riksdag from the Social Democrats
Women members of the Riksdag
Living people